Al-Huda Institute is a Salafist organization which runs chain of religious schools with campuses in Islamabad and Karachi, Pakistan as well as in Missisauga, Ontario, Canada.

Ideology
Al-Huda's founder, Farhat Hashimi, has stated that they do not follow any particular sect of contemporary Islam and refer to themselves simply as Muslims as was done during the time of early Islam .

It is known for its conservative religious syllabus with a focus on scripture. Faiza Mushtaq, who did her PhD on Al Huda, says the schools produce "activists and reformers" who believe they are returning to "'real Islam, true and pure." Sadaf Ahmad of Lahore University says "Al Huda founder Farhat Hashmi's denunciation of various cultural practices and disapproval of Westerners and Indians gives women a new conception of their identity as Muslims."

Canadian Branch
Al-Huda's Mississauga campus opened in 2004 and is a private school accredited by the Ontario Ministry of Education. As of 2015 it offers two main fields of study. There were about 160 female students in kindergarten to Grade 6 attending daily classes. On evenings and weekends the school offers seminars for teenagers and adults.

Students linked to terror groups
Tashfeen Malik, the Pakistani co-perpetrator of a shooting attack in San Bernardino on December 2, 2015, was a student of al-Huda before marrying and moving to California. There she and her husband executed the worst Islamic terror attack in the U.S. since the September 11 attacks in 2001, killing 14, and seriously injuring, 22 people.

Four Canadian female students ranging from 16 to early 20s, attended seminars at the Mississauga branch between about 2013–2015. They then traveled to the Middle East to join ISIL in Syria. The oldest woman attended the school for three months in 2012, and according to an interview her sister gave CBC News, she has been living in Syria since summer of 2014. In July 2014 the three younger girls were intercepted by security personal in Turkey and sent back to Canada before they reached ISIL territory.

Notable alumni
 Tashfeen Malik – Islamic terrorist who was one of the perpetrators of the 2015 San Bernardino attack in which 14 people were murdered

References

Islamic universities and colleges in Canada
Religious schools in Pakistan
Terrorism in Pakistan
Salafism in Pakistan